Arunodhayam is a 1971 Indian Tamil-language film, directed by Muktha Srinivasan and produced by V. Ramasamy. The film stars Sivaji Ganesan, B. Saroja Devi, R. Muthuraman and Lakshmi. It was released on 5 March 1971.

Plot 

Prabhu and Nirmala are siblings. Nirmala falls in love with Arun. One day she tells her brother about her love. Prabhu is surprised and decide to meet Arun, but finds out that Arun is a drunkard. The story continues with how Prabhu faces this problem and marries off Nirmala to Arun.

Cast 
Sivaji Ganesan as Prabhu
B. Saroja Devi as Shanthi
R. Muthuraman as Arun
Lakshmi as Nirmala
Anjali Devi as Prabhu and Nirmala's mother
V. S. Raghavan as Viswanathan
V. Gopalakrishnan as Antony Morasis
Cho as Dr. Siranjeevi
Manorama as Radha
Thengai Srinivasan as Nithyanandan
Vennira Aadai Moorthy as Information Bureau (I.B) officer
Jayakumari as Dancer
Kanakadurga as Club Dancer
Neelu as Rowdy Ranga
V. R. Rajagopal as Mani
S. Rama Rao as Rama
Senthamarai as Jambu
K. Kannan as Prakash as Car Racer
Comedy Shanmugam as Shanmugam

Soundtrack 
The music was composed by K. V. Mahadevan, with lyrics by Kannadasan.

References

External links 
 

1970s Tamil-language films
1971 films
Films directed by Muktha Srinivasan
Films scored by K. V. Mahadevan